Odalmis Limonta (born 13 January 1972) is a Cuban sprinter. She competed in the women's 4 × 400 metres relay at the 1992 Summer Olympics.

References

External links
 

1972 births
Living people
Athletes (track and field) at the 1992 Summer Olympics
Cuban female sprinters
Olympic athletes of Cuba
Place of birth missing (living people)
Pan American Games medalists in athletics (track and field)
Pan American Games silver medalists for Cuba
Athletes (track and field) at the 1991 Pan American Games
Medalists at the 1991 Pan American Games
Olympic female sprinters
20th-century Cuban women